Ann Courtenay Welch OBE, née Edmonds, (20 May 1917 – 5 December 2002) was a pilot who received the Gold Air Medal from Fédération Aéronautique Internationale (FAI) for her contributions to the development of four air sports - gliding, hang gliding, paragliding and microlight flying. She flew as a ferry pilot in the Air Transport Auxiliary during the Second World War.

Early life
Welch was born in London; the daughter of a railway engineer. As a child, Ann (Edmonds) kept a diary listing every aeroplane that flew over the house. She first flew with Alan Cobham in 1930.  After she had acquired a motorbike to visit the local aerodrome, she learned to fly, earning her pilot's licence in 1934 one month after her seventeenth birthday. From an early age she excelled in drawing and painting, and was a painter of note.

Pre-war and World War II
Welch started gliding in 1937 and attended an Anglo-German Fellowship Camp at the London Gliding Club meeting Wolf Hirth and Hanna Reitsch followed by a return visit to Germany in 1938.  She restarted the Surrey Gliding Club in 1938 at Redhill, Surrey becoming their Chief Flying Instructor and achieving a membership of over 100.

When the Second World War broke out she enrolled in the Air Transport Auxiliary, ferrying many types of aircraft including Spitfires, Hurricanes, Blenheims and Wellingtons from the factories to their operational units. She stopped this work shortly before the birth of her first daughter. In 1943, Welch (under the name "A. C. Douglas") published Cloud Reading for Pilots.  The book, quite unique at the time, remains an excellent introduction on the use of cloud observations in assessing the state of the atmosphere.

Gliding
After the war Welch returned to gliding and with Lorne Welch and Walter Morison (two former prisoners at Colditz Castle) restarted the Surrey Gliding Club, eventually moving it in 1951 to Lasham Airfield.  She trained many pilots and instructors while bringing up a young family, sometimes shouting instructions to a family member as she flew past in an open-cockpit glider. For twenty years she was in charge of the British Gliding Association's panel of examiners responsible for British instructor standards and training. She was an avid cross-country pilot and became a member of the British team at World Gliding Championships for many years. Flying from Lezno in Poland in 1961, she broke the British women's distance record with 528km. Her books on aviation are still widely admired and sought after. She flew over 150 types of aircraft.

Administration
Welch was an active volunteer to the British Gliding Association as vice chairman. She also managed the British Gliding Team for twenty years, and organised competitions including the World Gliding Championships at South Cerney in 1965. Later, she was elected as delegate to the FAI's International Gliding Commission and acted as jury member at several World Gliding Championships.

For many years she and Philip Wills administered British gliding until the members felt that a change was needed. Conscious of the increasing cost of gliding and the need to involve young people, she moved away from gliding and became closely involved in the development of hang gliding and paragliding, and was founder President of the FAI's Hang Gliding Commission and its Paragliding Commission, and was a member of the FAI's Microlight Commission. She became president of the British Hang Gliding Association and when in 1991, the hang-gliders and paragliders joined forces, Welch was appointed president of the British Hang Gliding and Paragliding Association. In 1978 she was appointed the president of the British Microlight Aircraft Association, a position she held until her death, working actively for the association including attending as a member of their governing council.

Awards and honours
Welch was awarded the FAI Bronze Medal (1969) and the Lilienthal Gliding Medal (1973) (only the fourth woman to be awarded it following Marcelle Choisnet (1951), Pelagia Majewska (1960) and Anne Burns (1966)). 

She received the FAI Gold Air Medal (1980) in recognition of her devotion to the training and encouragement of young pilots. (With the Gold Medal she joined a group that included Yuri Gagarin and Frank Whittle.) In 1989 she was awarded the FAI's Pelagia Majewska Gliding Medal as an outstanding female glider pilot.

She was appointed MBE in 1953 and advanced to OBE in 1966. In 1996 she was awarded the Gold Medal of the Royal Aero Club. Her love of outdoor included sailing and studied the wind and tides. This was ultimately rewarded when in 1997 she was elected an Honorary Fellow of the Royal Institute of Navigation.

In 2005, the Ann Welch Award was instituted for outstanding contributions to instruction in air sports.  It was first presented in 2006 at Royal Aero Club's Awards Ceremony. Also in 2006, the FAI created the Ann Welch Diploma which may be awarded each year to the pilot or crew of a microlight or paramotor who made the most meritorious flight which resulted in a world record.

Annually, usually in late spring since 2006, the Royal Aeronautical Society holds its Ann Welch named lecture in London, typically on a General Aviation theme.

Personal life
In 1939 Ann (Edmonds) married Graham Douglas whose family owned Redhill Aerodrome and who had loaned the club the £300 needed to buy the necessary gliders and a winch. This marriage was eventually dissolved and five years later she married Lorne Welch in 1953. Lorne Welch predeceased her but she was survived by her three daughters.

Bibliography
 Accidents Happen  John Murray 24 Aug 1978
 New Soaring Pilot (with Frank Irving and for first edition: Lorne Welch)  John Murray 25 Aug 1977
 Happy to Fly (autobiography)  John Murray 22 September 1983
 The Story of Gliding  John Murray 22 May 1980
 Pilot's Weather  John Murray 29 Oct 1973
 Hang Glider Pilot (with Gerry Breen)  John Murray Dec 1977
 Gliding (Know the Game)  A & C Black 27 October 1994
 Hang Gliding (Know the Game)  A & C Black 16 Jan 1986
 The Book of Airsports  Batsford 27 Jun 1978
 The Complete Soaring Guide (Flying & Gliding)  A & C Black 24 April 1986
 Complete Microlight Guide  EP 23 Sep 1983
 Soaring Hang Gliders  John Murray 21 May 1981
 Cloud Reading for Pilots (as "A. C. Douglas")  John Murray 1943
and many others

References

1917 births
2002 deaths
English aviators
Gliding in England
Aviation writers
Glider pilots
Air Transport Auxiliary pilots
Officers of the Order of the British Empire
Lilienthal Gliding Medal recipients
British women aviators
Glider flight record holders
British aviation record holders
British flight instructors
British women aviation record holders
20th-century English women writers
20th-century English non-fiction writers